The 2014 1. deild kvinnur was the 30th season of women's league football in the Faroe Islands.

The league was won by KÍ, its 15th consecutive title and 16th overall. By winning, KÍ qualified to 2015–16 UEFA Women's Champions League.

League table

Top scorers

References

External links
1. deild kvinnur at kvinnufotbolt.com 
1. Deild Women 2014 at Soccerway

1. deild kvinnur seasons
Faroe Islands
Faroe Islands
women